The demographic features of the population of Georgia include population growth, population density, ethnicity, education level, health, economic status, religious affiliations, and other aspects of the population.

Demographic trends
The demographic situation in Georgia, like that of some other former Soviet republics (especially Estonia and Latvia), has been characterized by two prominent features since independence: decline in total population and significant "Georgianization" of the ethnic composition. The proportion of ethnic Georgians increased by full 10 percentage points between 1989 and 2002, rising from 73.7% to 83.7% of the population. This occurred due to two migratory movements: Georgians living and working in other Soviet republics returned to their homeland, while other nationalities left Georgia.   

While Georgia was part of the Soviet Union the population grew steadily, rising from less than 4 million in the 1950s to a peak of 5.5 million in 1992. From 1992 the population began to decline sharply due to civil war and economic crisis driven mass migration throughout the 1990s and into the early 2000s. By 2013, the population has stabilized around 3.7 million (excluding Abkhazia and Tskhinvali Region). The 2002 population census in Georgia revealed a net migration loss of more than one million persons, or 20% of the population, since the early 1990s, confirmed by other studies. Other factors of the population decline include nett birth-death deficits in the period 1995-2010 and the exclusion of Abkhazia and Tskhinvali Region from the statistics since 1994, which population was estimated in 2005 at 178,000 and 49,200, respectively. 

Georgia was named among the highest-emigration countries in the world (relative to its population size) in a 2007 World Bank report. Russia received by far most migrants from Georgia. According to United Nations data this totalled to 625 thousand by 2000, which has declined to 450 thousand by 2019. Initially the out-migration was driven by non-Georgian ethnicities, but due to the war and crisis ridden 1990s, and the subsequent bad economic outlook, increasing numbers of Georgians emigrated as well. The 1989 census recorded 341,000 ethnic Russians, or 6.3 per cent of the population, which declined to 26,453 (0,7%) by 2014. The 2010 Russian census recorded about 158,000 ethnic Georgians living in Russia, 

The figure below shows the demographic trend in Georgia since 1950.

 
Note: 1993–1994 drop is exclusion of Abkhazia and Tskhinvali Region from population statistics.

Data correction
The 2014 census, executed in collaboration with the United Nations Population Fund (UNFPA), found a population gap of approximately 700,000 compared to the 2014 data from the National Statistical Office of Georgia, Geostat, which was cumulatively built on the 2002 census. Consecutive research estimated the 2002 census to be inflated by 8 to 9 percent, which affected the annually updated population estimates in subsequent years. One explanation put forward by UNFPA is that families of emigrants continued to list them in 2002 as residents for fear of losing certain rights or benefits. Other factors that distorted the demographic data included a lack of quality in the registration system of migration, births, deaths and marriages. It was not until around 2010 that parts of the system became reliable again. With the support of the UNFPA, the demographic data of the period 1994–2014 has been retro-projected. The results of the project were presented and published in 2018. Based on this back-projection Geostat has corrected its data for these years, both in its annual publications starting from 2018, and its public access database.

Vital statistics

Sources: United Nations, Demoscope, GeoStat
Total population from 1994: excluding Abkhazia and Tskhinvali Region. Corrected as per retro-projection and as published in public access database.

Births and deaths

Total area

1Births and deaths until 1959 are estimates.

Excluding Abkhazia and Tskhinvali Region

Source: Geostat public database, Geostat website, section Population and Demography.

Current vital statistics
Source:

Life expectancy

Structure of the population 

Structure of the population (01.01.2019) :

Ethnic groups

Georgians are the predominant ethnic group in Georgia, according to the 2014 census 86.83% of the population. The proportion in 2014 was much higher than in preceding censuses as in 2014 Abkhazia and Tskhinvali Region were not under government control and therefore not included. As a result of this the proportion of Ossetians and Abkhazians was very low (0.39% and 0.02%, respectively).

Languages

The most widespread language group is the Kartvelian family, which includes Georgian, Svan, Mingrelian and Laz. The official languages of Georgia are Georgian, with Abkhaz having official status within the autonomous region of Abkhazia. Georgian is the primary language of 87.7 percent of the population, followed by 6.2 percent speaking Azerbaijani, 3.9 percent Armenian, 1.2 percent Russian, and 1 percent other languages.

Religion

See also
Georgia
Azerbaijanis in Georgia
Armenians in Georgia
Russians in Georgia
Greeks in Georgia
Caucasus Greeks
Assyrians in Georgia

Notes

References

External links
Zhvania, Irakli: "Housing in Georgia" in the Caucasus Analytical Digest No. 23